Amelanchier pallida, the pale serviceberry or western serviceberry, is a species of Amelanchier native to the US states of California and Arizona. They are shrubs or small trees reaching , with attractive blue-green foliage. Native Americans used to dry the berries for winter provisions, and they can be made into a jam.

References

Endemic flora of the United States
Trees of the Southwestern United States
Plants described in 1891
pallida